Barasat Kalikrishna Girls' High School is a heritage high school for girls in Barasat, West Bengal, India.

History 
It was established in 1847 by Kalikrishna Mitra, with the support of Nabinkrishna Mitra and Peary Charan Sarkar.

The school faced resistance from conservative Brahmin in Bengal but was able to sustain the school due to the support of John Elliot Drinkwater Bethune. It has the distinction of being the first non-government girls’ school, run by Indians. This is the first free Girls' High School of British India established by any Indian except Christian Missionary or Government.

References 

Primary schools in West Bengal
High schools and secondary schools in West Bengal
Girls' schools in West Bengal
Schools in North 24 Parganas district
Barasat
Educational institutions established in 1847
1847 establishments in British India